Kim Dae-Beom (February 10, 1992 – April 15, 2019) was a South Korean modern pentathlete.

He won the surprising gold medal in the individual modern pentathlon at the inaugural 2010 Youth Olympics.  Kim claimed victory with a total of 4,588 points. Ilya Shugarov of Russia came second with 4,568 points and Jorge Camacho of Mexico was third at 4,548 points.

References

External links
 Profile and interview from Pentathlon.org

1992 births
2019 deaths
South Korean male modern pentathletes
Modern pentathletes at the 2010 Summer Youth Olympics
Youth Olympic gold medalists for South Korea